Bimal-Kumar are fictional characters created by Bengali novelist Hemendra Kumar Roy. These are popular figures of Bengali Children's literature. Roy wrote almost thirty Bimal-Kumar stories and novel. Some of them are science fiction.

Characters
They are two Bengali friends named Bimal and Kumar. Both are adventurous, daredevil and intelligent. The duos like to solve mysteries, roam all over the world, search hidden treasure and live a fearless life. They are bachelors. Their old, loyal servant Ramhari and pet dog Bagha accompany them. Ramhari acts as their guardian. Binoy babu, a man with versatile knowledge and a school boy Kamal sometimes joins their adventure.

Stories
 Jawker Dhan
 Abar Jawker Dhan
 Meghduter Martye Agamon
 Maynamatir Mayakanon
 Amabasyar Raat
 Jerinar Konthohar
 Dragoner Duswapno
 Amrita Dwip
 Sonar Pahere Jatri
 Nil Sayorer Achinpure
 Sundorboner Roktopagol
 Kumarer Bagha Goyenda
 Himaloyer Voyonkor
 Surjyanagarir Guptadhan
 Prashanter Agnyeodwip
 Jokkhopotir Rotnopuri
 Kuber Purir Rahasyo
 Sulu Sagorer Vuture Desh
 Asomvaber Deshe
 Kumar Bimoler Rahasyo Adventure
 Adrishyer Kirti
 Pishach
 Daliar Apomrityu
 Agadh Joler Rui Katla
 Baba Mustafar Dari
 Boner Bhetore Notun Voy
 Guhabasi Bivisan
 Je Churi Kotha koy
 Mandhatar Mulluke

Film adaptation
Jakher Dhan (Treasure of the Sacred Spirit), the first and most popular story of Bimal and Kumar, was filmed by director Haricharan Bhanja in 1939. This movie starred Chhaya Devi, Ahindra Choudhury and Jahar Ganguly. Another Bimal-Kumar story Abar Jakher Dhan was telecast as a television serial in the 1990s. A Bengali movie, Jawker Dhan, was released in August, 2017, directed by Sayantan Ghosal. The roles of Bimal and Kumar were played by Parambrata Chatterjee and Rahul Banerjee, respectively. In 2019, the sequel to Jawker Dhan was released titled Sagardwipey Jawker Dhan.

References

Culture of Kolkata
Fictional Bengali people
Fictional Indian people
Characters in children's literature
Bengali-language literature
Adventure novels